Zebulun (also Zebulon, Zabulon, or Zaboules) was, according to the Books of Genesis and Numbers, the last of the six sons of Jacob and Leah (Jacob's tenth son), and the founder of the Israelite Tribe of Zebulun.  Some biblical scholars believe this to be an eponymous metaphor providing an aetiology of the connectedness of the tribe to others in the Israelite confederation. With Leah as a matriarch, biblical scholars believe the tribe to have been regarded by the text's authors as a part of the original Israelite confederation.

The Tomb of Zebulun is located in Sidon, Lebanon. In the past, towards the end of Iyyar, Jews from the most distant parts of the land of Israel would make a pilgrimage to this tomb.

Etymology 
The name is derived from the Northwest Semitic root zbl, common in 2nd millennium BCE Ugaritic texts as an epithet (title) of the god Baal, as well as in Phoenician and (frequently) in Biblical Hebrew in personal names.

The text of the Torah gives two different etymologies for the name Zebulun, which textual scholars attribute to different sources – one to the Jahwist and the other to the Elohist; the first being that it derives from zebed, the word for gift, in reference to Leah's view that her gaining of six sons was a gift from God; the second being that it derives from yizbeleni, meaning honour, in reference to Leah's hope that Jacob would give her honour now that she had given birth to six sons. In Deuteronomy, however an allusion is made to a third potential etymology – that it may be connected with zibhe, literally meaning sacrifice, in reference to commercial activities of the tribe of Zebulun – a commercial agreement made at Mount Tabor between the tribe of Zebulun and a group of non-Israelites was referred to as zibhe-tzedek, literally meaning sacrifice to justice or sacrifice to Tzedek.

Some believe the depopulated village of Sabalan in the District of Safad was named after Zebulun.

Biblical account 
The Torah states that Zebulun had three sons – Sered, Elon, and Jahleel – each the eponymous founder of a clan. Beyond this, there is little other reference to Zebulun.

References

External links

Founders of biblical tribes
Children of Jacob